The 2000 United States Senate election in Hawaii took place on November 7, 2000. Incumbent Democratic U.S. Senator Daniel Akaka won re-election to his second full term.

Major candidates

Democrat 
 Daniel Akaka, incumbent U.S. Senator

Republican 
 John Carroll, former state senator and former state representative

Results

See also 
 2000 United States Senate elections

References 

Hawaii
2000
United States Senate